The 1931 Iowa Hawkeyes football team was an American football team that represented the University of Iowa during the 1931 college football season as a member of the Big Ten Conference. In their eighth year under head coach Burt Ingwersen, the Hawkeyes compiled an overall record of 1–6–1, with a mark of 0–3–1 in conference play.

Schedule

References

Iowa
Iowa Hawkeyes football seasons
Iowa Hawkeyes football